Moog is a surname. People bearing the name include:

 Andy Moog (born 1960), former NHL goaltender and current assistant coach of the Dallas Stars
 Peter Moog (1871–1930), schizophrenic outsider artist
 Philipp Moog (born 1961), German television actor
 Michael Moog (fl. 1990s), a moniker of music producer Peter Damien
 Robert Moog (1934–2005), an American pioneer of electronic music and inventor of the Moog synthesizer
 William “Bill” C. Moog (1915-1997), American founder of Moog Inc., cousin of Robert Moog
 Willy Moog (1888–1935), philosopher